Ormaniçi can refer to the following villages in Turkey:

 Ormaniçi, Adıyaman
 Ormaniçi, Sındırgı